Cârlogani is a commune in Olt County, Oltenia, Romania. It is composed of five villages: Beculești, Cârlogani, Cepari, Scorbura and Stupina.

References

Communes in Olt County
Localities in Oltenia